Netretić is a village and a municipality in Karlovac County, Croatia. There are 2,862 inhabitants, 99% of whom are Croats.

The settlements in the municipality are:

 Baići (population 0)
 Bogovci (population 3)
 Brajakovo Brdo (population 116)
 Bukovje Netretićko (population 49)
 Culibrki (population 4)
 Donje Prilišće (population 80)
 Donje Stative (population 197)
 Dubravci (population 161)
 Dubravčani (population 243)
 Frketić Selo (population 74)
 Goli Vrh Netretićki (population 7)
 Gornje Prilišće (population 48)
 Jakovci Netretićki (population 21)
 Jarče Polje (population 127)
 Kolenovac (population 12)
 Kučevice (population 119)
 Kunići Ribnički (population 22)
 Ladešići (population 28)
 Lončar Brdo (population 5)
 Lonjgari (population 2)
 Maletići (population 144)
 Mali Modruš Potok (population 41)
 Mračin (population 263)
 Mrzljaki (population 17)
 Netretić (population 58)
 Novigrad na Dobri (population 85)
 Pavičići (population 2)
 Piščetke (population 15)
 Planina Kunićka (population 3)
 Račak (population 0)
 Rešetarevo (population 42)
 Rosopajnik (population 20)
 Skupica (population 144)
 Srednje Prilišće (population 24)
 Straža (population 79)
 Tončići (population 65)
 Veliki Modruš Potok (population 21)
 Vinski Vrh (population 111)
 Vukova Gorica (population 52)
 Zaborsko Selo (population 16)
 Zagradci (population 265)
 Završje Netretićko (population 77)

References

External links

 

Municipalities of Croatia
Populated places in Karlovac County